SM U-35 was a German U 31-class U-boat which operated in the Mediterranean Sea during World War I. It ended up being the most successful U-boat participating in the war, sinking 220 merchant ships for a total of .

Her longest serving captain was Lothar von Arnauld de la Perière. Under his command, U-35 sank 191 ships, making him the most successful submarine commander in history.

Design
German Type U 31 submarines were double-hulled ocean-going submarines similar to Type 23 and Type 27 subs in dimensions and differed only slightly in propulsion and speed. They were considered very good high seas boats with average manoeuvrability and good surface steering.

The U-boat was armed with four  torpedo tubes, two fitted in the bow and two in the stern, with carried 6 torpedoes. In 1915 U-35 was equipped with a  Uk L/30 deck gun, which was replaced with a  gun in 1916–17. The boat's complement was 4 officers and 31 enlisted men.

Service history
U-35s keel was laid on 20 December 1912 at the Friedrich Krupp Germaniawerft shipyard in Kiel. Its delivery date was supposed to be 1 March 1914, but it was delayed due to development problems with its diesel engines. U-35 officially entered service on 3 November 1914, under the command of Kapitänleutnant Waldemar Kophamel. The lead engineer was Hans Fechter. It sailed with the II Flottille, stationed in Heligoland.

U-35 completed its first two deployments in reconnaissance actions in the North Sea. U-35 made two more voyages and destroyed 13 more merchant ships totaling . These included on 23 October 1915 the British transport  in the Aegean Sea. She was carrying an Ammunition Column of the 29th Division; and also staff of the 1st New Zealand Stationary Hospital, despite a British hospital ship Grantully Castle sailing on the same route on the same day.

On 9 November 1915, with the help of sister U-34, U-35 sank the SS Californian, a cargo ship best known for its inaction during the sinking of the RMS Titanic on 15 April 1912, despite being the closest ship in the area. U-35 delivered a coup-de-grace after U-34 had attacked Californian earlier. She was under tow from a French patrol boat when U-35 moved in to finish her off. Coincidentally, U-35 would also come within close proximity of the ill-fated Titanic'''s sister ship RMS Olympic on an unknown date in 1916, but "conditions made attack impossible."

On 13 November 1915, Kptlt. de la Perière took command of U-35. Additionally, U-35 sank the British gunboat  on 29 February 1916 and the French gunboat Rigel on 2 October 1916.

On 26 February 1916, she successfully torpedoed and sank the Armed merchant cruiser , carrying 1,800 French troops, near Cerigo Island with a loss of 990 men.U-35s fourteenth patrol (26 July to 20 August 1916) under de la Perière stands as the most successful submarine patrol of all time. During that period, 54 merchant ships totaling  were sunk.

She also sank on 4 October 1916, the French transport ship , leading to the death of between 600 and 1,800 men.Kptlt. Ernst von Voigt took command of U-35 on 17 March 1918. He undertook two patrols, an enemy engagement and a redeployment cruise, between 7 September and 9 October 1918, but both were promptly broken off because of engine damage. On 14 October 1918, Kptlt. Heino von Heimburg took command and U-35 was transferred to Kiel.

Fate
After World War I ended, U-35 was transferred to England and docked in Blyth from 1919 to 1920, then broken up.

 Original documents from Room 40 

Summary of raiding history

 Notes 

Citations

Bibliography

 
 Eberhard Rössler: Geschichte des deutschen U-Bootbaus – Band 1. Bernard & Graefe Verlag 1996, 
 Bodo Herzog: Deutsche U-Boote 1906-1966''. Manfred Pawlak Verlags GmbH, Herrschingen 1990,

External links

 Photos of cruises of German submarine U-54 in 1916-1918. Great photo quality, comments in German.
 A 44 min. film from 1917 about a cruise of the German submarine U-35. A German propaganda film without dead or wounded; many details about submarine warfare in World War I. In 6 parts.
 
 Room 40:  original documents, photos and maps about World War I German submarine warfare and British Room 40 Intelligence from The National Archives, Kew, Richmond, UK.

German Type U 31 submarines
U-boats commissioned in 1914
World War I submarines of Germany
1914 ships
Ships built in Kiel